Mersing Airport  is an airport in Mersing District, Johor, Malaysia.

See also

List of airports in Malaysia

References

Airports in Johor
Mersing District